List of works by or about the American writer Joan Didion.

Novels 
 Run, River (1963)
 Play It as It Lays (1970)
 A Book of Common Prayer (1977)
 Democracy (1984)
 The Last Thing He Wanted (1996)

Nonfiction
 Slouching Towards Bethlehem (1968)
 The White Album (1979)
 Salvador (1983)
 Miami (1987)
 After Henry (1992)
 Political Fictions (2001)
 Where I Was From (2003)
 Fixed Ideas: America Since 9.11 (2003; preface by Frank Rich)
 Vintage Didion (2004; selected excerpts of previous works)
 The Year of Magical Thinking (2005)
 We Tell Ourselves Stories in Order to Live: Collected Nonfiction (2006; includes her first seven volumes of nonfiction)
 Blue Nights (2011) 
 South and West: From a Notebook (2017) 
 Let Me Tell You What I Mean (2021)

Screenplays and plays
 
 Play It as It Lays (1972) (with John Gregory Dunne and based on her novel)
 A Star Is Born (1976) (with John Gregory Dunne)
 True Confessions (1981) (with John Gregory Dunne and based on his novel)
 Up Close & Personal (1996) (with John Gregory Dunne)
  As it Happens (2012) (with Todd Field)
 The Year of Magical Thinking (2007) (a stage play based on her book)

Essays and reporting

Critical studies and reviews of Didion's work

Notes

Bibliographies by writer
Bibliographies of American writers